Preetha is an Indian television personality and film producer. She also hosted Cinema Karam Coffee on STAR Vijay and the popular cookery show Sunday Samayal on Sun TV. While still in college she received an offer for acting in an advertisement. After a one-year career in advertisements Preetha began her television career with the serial Aalayam which aired on Sun TV in 1999. She has acted in several Tamil language serials that were screened on Sun TV. She also has participated in the first series of the dance reality show Jodi Number One along with her husband Raaghav in STAR Vijay. The couple was one of the three finalists.

Preetha produced the fantasy thriller film Nanjupuram which featured her husband Raaghav in the lead role. It was Raaghav's debut film. She also participated in the music show Gold Winner Isai Kudumbam and serials like Chithi (Sun TV) and Marumagal (Vijay TV). She acted in the serial Maanada Mayilaada on Kalaignar TV along with his husband. They both played the characters of terrorists. She is also a Mohiniattam and Bharatnatyam dancer.

Preetha's first film appearance was in Dumm Dumm Dumm (2001). She received her school education in Muscat, bachelor's degree in travel management from Ethiraj College for Women in Chennai. Master's degree in Social Work from DG Vaishnav College. While studying in DG Vaishnav College she married music director and television actor Raaghav. She studied at Ohio University on a scholarship. To earn her living in Ohio Preetha taught Public Speaking and Bharatnatyam. She also works as a soft-skills trainer in Wipro.

Filmography

As an actress

As a producer 
Nanjupuram (2011)
Ticket (2017)

Television
Serials

Shows

References

External links 

Indian women television presenters
Indian television presenters
Living people
Year of birth missing (living people)
Indian women film producers
Tamil film producers
Ohio University alumni
Tamil television actresses